Jovan Čađenović (born 13 January 1995) is a Montenegrin footballer who plays for lithuanian FK Panevėžys.

Club career
Born in Cetinje, Čađenović joined FK Partizan at the age of 15 and passed all youth categories with the club. After a season he spent as a scholar of the satellite club Teleoptik, Čađenović signed his first professional contract with Partizan on 10 July 2015. Later, same year he extended his loan spell at Teleoptik for the 2015–16 season. After the 2015–16 Serbian First League season he spent with Bežanija, Čađenović moved to Zemun in summer 2017. On the last day of the summer transfer window 2017, Čađenović moved to Borac Čačak.

In 15 November 2019 ended contact with Lithuanian Sūduva. Since 2018 to 2019 season he defended Sūduva`s honour in 27 matches of lithuanian A Lyga, also ir Lithuanian Cup and European tournaments. 

On 21 January 2020 he signed with Kazakhstan Premier League club Taraz.

Career statistics

Club

References

External links 
 
 
 

1995 births
Living people
Sportspeople from Cetinje
Association football midfielders
Montenegrin footballers
Montenegro youth international footballers
FK Partizan players
FK Teleoptik players
FK Bežanija players
FK Zemun players
FK Borac Čačak players
FK Sūduva Marijampolė players
FC Taraz players
FC Kaisar players
Serbian First League players
Serbian SuperLiga players
A Lyga players
Kazakhstan Premier League players
Montenegrin expatriate footballers
Expatriate footballers in Serbia
Montenegrin expatriate sportspeople in Serbia
Expatriate footballers in Lithuania
Montenegrin expatriate sportspeople in Lithuania
Expatriate footballers in Kazakhstan
Montenegrin expatriate sportspeople in Kazakhstan